Milagros Beatriz Cámere Puga (born 22 September 1972) is a Peruvian female former volleyball player. She was part of the Peru women's national volleyball team. 

She competed with the national team at the 1996 Summer Olympics, and the 2000 Summer Olympics in Sydney, Australia, finishing 11th.

She participated in the 1994 FIVB Volleyball Women's World Championship.

See also
 Peru at the 2000 Summer Olympics

References

External links
 
 
 

 1972 births
 Living people
 Peruvian women's volleyball players
 Place of birth missing (living people)
 Volleyball players at the 1996 Summer Olympics
 Volleyball players at the 2000 Summer Olympics
 Olympic volleyball players of Peru
Volleyball players at the 1991 Pan American Games
Medalists at the 1991 Pan American Games
Pan American Games bronze medalists for Peru
Pan American Games medalists in volleyball
20th-century Peruvian women
21st-century Peruvian women